Joaquín Quinteros (born 11 March 1992) is an Argentine professional footballer who plays as a forward for Mitre.

Career
Quinteros' career began with Vélez Sarsfield, before he appeared for Instituto Deportivo Santiago in Torneo Argentino B in 2013–14. After departing at the conclusion of the aforementioned competition, Quinteros spent the rest of 2014 with San Jorge. In 2015, Quinteros joined Juventud Antoniana of Torneo Federal A. After scoring one goal, against Unión Sunchales, in fourteen fixtures for Juventud Antoniana, the forward sealed a return to Instituto Deportivo Santiago in January 2016. Six months later, Quinteros made the move back to tier three to join Mitre. He netted five goals as they were promoted.

Quinteros then scored seven goals in his first campaign in professional football, notably notching a brace against Boca Unidos in March 2018 as the club went on to finish thirteenth in 2017–18. Quinteros left Mitre in July 2019, subsequently spending a season with Atlético de Rafaela. August 2020 saw Quinteros join fellow Primera B Nacional team Gimnasia y Esgrima. Mitre

In January 2022, Quinteros joined Mitre.

Career statistics
.

References

External links

1992 births
Living people
Sportspeople from San Miguel de Tucumán
Argentine footballers
Association football forwards
Torneo Argentino B players
Torneo Federal A players
Primera Nacional players
San Jorge de Tucumán footballers
Juventud Antoniana footballers
Club Atlético Mitre footballers
Atlético de Rafaela footballers
Gimnasia y Esgrima de Jujuy footballers